ScreenTonic SA is a Paris-based company founded in 2001. ScreenTonic is a mobile advertising company, and it has been a pioneer in the field.

The most prominent product developed by ScreenTonic is the STAMP technology platform, which 
allows the management and delivery of advertisements on mobiles. STAMP  consists of a management platform, ad server, and reporting and billing tools.

ScreenTonic was acquired by Microsoft on May 3, 2007, and their technologies were merged into Microsoft adCenter.

References

External links
Official Website

Online advertising services and affiliate networks
Microsoft acquisitions
Microsoft subsidiaries